Amphipoea lucens, the large ear or large ear moth, is a moth of the family Noctuidae. It was first described by Christian Friedrich Freyer in 1845 and it is found in most of Europe.

the wingspan is about 30–36 mm. It resembles Amphipoea oculea, but is larger, and with the ground colour, as a rule, pale and the reniform white.

Adults are on wing from August to September.

The larvae feed on the roots and stem bases of various grasses, especially Molinia caerulea.

Similar species
Requiring genitalic examination to separate See Townsend et al.,
Amphipoea fucosa
Amphipoea crinanensis
Amphipoea oculea

References

External links

 Taxonomy
Lepiforum e.V. Includes photo of genitalia
De Vlinderstichting 

Acronictinae
Moths described in 1845
Moths of Europe
Taxa named by Christian Friedrich Freyer